Martin Armon Suji (born 2 June 1971) is a former Kenyan cricketer who played One-Day Internationals for the Kenyan national side between 1996 and 2006.

A right-handed batsman and a right-arm medium-fast bowler, his overall international career spanned from 1990 to 2006, and included matches at the 1996, 1999, and 2003 World Cups, as well as at the 1990, 1994, and 1997 ICC Trophies.

Suji is the older brother of Tony Suji, who also had a long career for Kenya. The brothers played together at the 1999 and 2003 World Cups.

Coaching career
Following the departure of Roger Harper after the 2007 ICC World Twenty20, Suji was made assistant coach of the national team, assisting the caretaker Alfred Njuguna (later replaced by Andy Kirsten as full time coach in May 2008). In February 2011, he was appointed senior coach of the Ugandan national team, replacing South African Shukri Conrad.

He remained in the role until May 2013, and oversaw the team at several major tournaments, including the 2011 WCL Division Two and 2013 Division Two tournaments, and the 2012 World Twenty20 Qualifier. One of Suji's assistant coaches at Uganda was Steve Tikolo, his former teammate.

In March 2018, Suji was appointed head coach of the Rwanda national cricket team on an initial four-month contract, encompassing the 2018–19 ICC World Twenty20 Africa Qualifier Eastern Subregion tournament.

References

External links
 

1971 births
Living people
Cricketers from Nairobi
Kenyan cricketers
Kenya One Day International cricketers
Cricketers at the 1996 Cricket World Cup
Cricketers at the 1998 Commonwealth Games
Cricketers at the 1999 Cricket World Cup
Cricketers at the 2003 Cricket World Cup
Western Chiefs cricketers
Kenyan cricket coaches
Coaches of the Uganda national cricket team
Kenyan expatriate sportspeople in Uganda
Coaches of the Rwanda national cricket team
Kenyan expatriate sportspeople in Rwanda
Commonwealth Games competitors for Kenya